Nowa Sucha  is a village in the administrative district of Gmina Grębków, within Węgrów County, Masovian Voivodeship, in east-central Poland.

The village has a population of 92.

Notable people
 August Cieszkowski (b. 12 September 1814), a philosopher, economist, and social and political activist

History 
A medieval village known as Sucha or Suska Wola. The first mention of the village dates back to 1425. From the 16th century, the property of the Suski family, Jasieńczyk coat of arms. From the second half of the 17th century to 1944, the estate was owned by the Cieszkowski family, Dołęga coat of arms. In 1787, the town was visited by King Stanisław August Poniatowski . August Cieszkowski was born in Sucha in 1814.

In the years 1945 - 1988 there was a state agricultural farm in the village.

Since 1993, the Museum of Wooden Architecture of the Siedlce Region has been operating in Sucha, founded on the initiative of Professor Marek Kwiatkowski.

References

Villages in Węgrów County